Antofagasta de la Sierra is the northernmost department of Catamarca Province in Argentina.

Volcanoes

The department is most famous for its volcanic activity. There are over 200 volcanos situated in the Antofagasta de la Sierra volcanic field, the most notable of them being Antofalla, Carachi Pampa, Alumbrera and Galán.

The Galán volcano has the largest explosive caldera in the world.

Pre-history
There is evidence of hunter-gatherer people in the region dating back about 8,000 years. Their diet largely consisted of wild camelid animals. Seeds of amaranth grain dating from 4,500 years ago and evidence—grinding artefacts—that they may have been used as food since 7,000 years ago have been found.

References

External links
Antofagasta de la Sierra webpage (Spanish)

Departments of Catamarca Province